Cities in Motion is a business simulation game developed by Colossal Order and published by Paradox Interactive. It was released for Microsoft Windows in 2011, with Mac OS X and Linux ports coming at later dates. The goal of the game is to implement and improve a public transport system in 4 European cities - Amsterdam, Berlin, Helsinki and Vienna. This can be achieved by building lines for metro trains, trams, boats, buses and helicopters.

Downloadable content
On April 5, 2011 Paradox Interactive released the DLC Cities in Motion: Design Classics, followed on May 12, 2011 by Cities in Motion: Design Marvels, featuring five new vehicles in each release. A third DLC, Cities in Motion: Design Now, was released on June 14, 2011, and included 5 new vehicles for each method of transportation. Cities in Motion: Metro Stations was released on the same day featuring 2 new metro stations.

On May 19, 2011 Paradox Interactive announced Cities in Motion: Tokyo, an expansion containing a new city, Tokyo, and campaign, new vehicles and the introduction of the Monorail to the game. Tokyo was released on May 31, 2011. A second expansion, German Cities, was released on September 14, 2011. It contained 2 new cities, Cologne and Leipzig. A poll on the game's Facebook page made the city of Munich a free download for all users in addition to the expansion pack. During their Holiday Teaser, Paradox Interactive released a photo of the Statue of Liberty with the title Cities in Motion. U.S. Cities was soon revealed in a press conference in January 2012. The game was released on January 17, 2012, featuring New York City and San Francisco as the two new cities. In addition, 5 new vehicles and 2 new methods of transportation were added to the game, making it the largest expansion yet.

On May 20, 2011 Paradox Interactive released the Mac version of Cities in Motion.

On November 20, 2012, the London DLC was released.

A port of Cities in Motion to Linux was announced by Paradox Interactive in 2013, with it eventually arriving via Steam on January 9, 2014.

Reception

The PC version of the original Cities in Motion received above-average reviews according to the review aggregation website Metacritic.

Sequel

On August 14, 2012 at the annual Gamescom video games trade fair in Cologne, Paradox Interactive announced the sequel, named Cities in Motion 2. It was released six months later on April 2, 2013.

See also
 Cities: Skylines - a full city simulator also by Colossal Order

References

External links

 (archived)
Cities in Motion at Paradox Interactive

2011 video games
Business simulation games
Linux games
MacOS games
Paradox Interactive games
Single-player video games
Transport simulation games
Video games developed in Finland
Video games set in Tokyo
Video games with downloadable content
Windows games
Colossal Order (company) games